The Bayer designations g Carinae and G Carinae refer to separate stars:

 g Carinae (HD 80230), a red giant near the border of Vela
 G Carinae (HR 3643), a binary system near β Centauri

Carinae, g
Carina (constellation)